Hyrum is the name of:

People
 Hyrum Rex Lee, Governor of American Samoa
 Hyrum Smith, an early leader in the Church of Jesus Christ of Latter-Day Saints religious movement
 Hyrum G. Smith, patriarch of the Church of Jesus Christ of Latter-Day Saints
 Hyrum M. Smith, apostle of the Church of Jesus Christ of Latter-Day Saints
 Hyrum W. Smith, businessman
 Hyrum D. Carroll, Professor of Computer Science
 Hyrum P. Feriante, Certified Rolfer and Biodynamic Craniosacral Therapist

Places
United States
 Hyrum, Utah
 Hyrum State Park